Wadjiginy, also known as Wagaydy (Wogait) and Batjamalh, is an Australian Aboriginal language.  Apart from being closely related to Kandjerramalh, it is not known to be related to any other language, though it has borrowed grammatical and lexical material from neighboring Northern Daly languages.

Wadjiginy was spoken in the Northern Territory.

Wadjiginy (Wadyiginy, Wagaydy, Wogaity) is the name of the people; this native language is Patjtjamalh (Batjamalh, Batytyamalh).

Phonology

Consonants 

 Voiceless stop sounds may also fluctuate to voiced sounds when in word-initial, intervocalic, post-nasal and post-liquid positions.
 /k, p/ can also be heard as fricatives [ɣ, β] when in intervocalic and post-liquid positions.
 /w/ can be heard as a bilabial approximant [β̞] when before front vowels /i, ɛ, ø/.

Vowels 

 /ø/ can also be realized as a higher [y] sound as well as [ø].

Vocabulary
Capell (1940) lists the following basic vocabulary items:

{| class="wikitable sortable"
! gloss
! Woːgaidj
|-
| man
| 
|-
| woman
| 
|-
| head
| 
|-
| eye
| 
|-
| nose
| 
|-
| mouth
| 
|-
| tongue
| 
|-
| stomach
| 
|-
| bone
| 
|-
| blood
| 
|-
| kangaroo
| 
|-
| opossum
| 
|-
| crow
| 
|-
| fly
| 
|-
| sun
| 
|-
| moon
| 
|-
| fire
| 
|-
| smoke
| 
|-
| water
| 
|-
|damn
|
|}

References

External links
 Batjamalh at the Dalylanguages.org website.

Wagaydyic languages